A by-election was held for the Australian House of Representatives seat of Corangamite on 29 August 1953. This was triggered by the death of Liberal MP Allan McDonald. A by-election for the seat of Lang was held on the same day.

The by-election was won by Liberal candidate Dan Mackinnon, who had previously served as the member for Wannon from 1949 to 1951.

Results

References

1953 elections in Australia
Victorian federal by-elections
1950s in Victoria (Australia)